The Swiss women's national under 18 ice hockey team is the national under-18 ice hockey team in Switzerland. The team represents Switzerland at the International Ice Hockey Federation's IIHF World Women's U18 Championships.

World Women's U18 Championship record

*Includes a loss in extra time (in the playoff round)
^Includes a loss in extra time (in the preliminary round)
**Includes a win in extra time (in the relegation round)
^^Includes two wins in extra time (in the preliminary and relegation round)

Team

Current roster
Roster for the 2022 IIHF World Women's U18 Championship.

Head coach: Melanie HäfligerAssistant coaches: Colin Muller, Christoph Scherrer

References

I
Women's national under-18 ice hockey teams